The transverse costal facet (or transverse costal fovea) is one of the costal facets, a site where a rib forms a joint with the transverse process of a thoracic vertebra.

References

External links
  - "The costovertebral joint."

Bones of the thorax